The Rogue–Umpqua Divide Wilderness is a wilderness area located in the Rogue River – Siskiyou and Umpqua National Forests in the Klamath Mountains of Oregon, United States.  It was established by the United States Congress in 1984 and comprises .

Topography
Volcanic activity created many unique volcanic and sedimentary rock outcrops.

Vegetation

Most of the Rogue–Umpqua Divide is covered in a dense forest composed of sugar pine, grand fir, mountain hemlock, western white pine, incense cedar, subalpine fir, western redcedar, white fir, ponderosa pine, Douglas-fir, Alaska cedar, shasta red fir, lodgepole pine, pacific silver fir, western hemlock, and whitebark pine.

The Acker Divide and Cripple Camp trails lead through large stands of old-growth forests.

Recreation
Popular recreational activities in the Wilderness include hiking, camping, and wildlife watching.  Approximately  of trails criss-cross the wilderness.  The most popular is the  Rogue–Umpqua Divide National Recreation Trail, which offers exceptional views to the east and west as it weaves across the crest of the divide.

See also
 List of Oregon Wildernesses
 List of U.S. Wilderness Areas
 Wilderness Act

References

External links

Rogue–Umpqua Divide Wilderness - Rogue River – Siskiyou National Forest
Rogue–Umpqua Divide Wilderness - Umpqua National Forest

Klamath Mountains
Rogue River-Siskiyou National Forest
Protected areas of Douglas County, Oregon
Old-growth forests
Wilderness areas of Oregon
Umpqua National Forest
1984 establishments in Oregon
Protected areas established in 1984